Soldier King may refer to:

 Frederick William I of Prussia (r. 1713-1740)
 Peter IV of Portugal (r. 1826)
 Victor Emmanuel III of Italy (r. 1900-1946)
 Albert I of Belgium (r. 1909-1934)